Peter Denning may refer to:

 Peter J. Denning (born 1942), computer scientist
 Peter Denning (cricketer) (1949–2007), cricketer for Somerset County Cricket Club